Horace Brindley (1 January 1885 – 1971) was an English footballer who played in the Football League for Blackpool, Lincoln City and Stoke as well as a number of Southern League clubs.

Career
Brindley began his career with his local side Knutton Villa before joining Stoke in 1904. He played four times for Stoke during the 1904–05 season and then left for Crewe Alexandra at the end of the season. He then played for Norwich City, spent a season with Blackpool, returned to Crewe, Southern League sides Queens Park Rangers and Luton Town. In 1912 he joined Lincoln City where he spent two seasons making 53 appearances scoring four goals. He ended his career with Chester City.

Career statistics
Source:

References

English footballers
Blackpool F.C. players
Chester City F.C. players
Crewe Alexandra F.C. players
Lincoln City F.C. players
Luton Town F.C. players
Norwich City F.C. players
Queens Park Rangers F.C. players
Stoke City F.C. players
English Football League players
1885 births
1971 deaths
Association football outside forwards